Xi'an Jiaotong University (XJTU) is a public research university in Xi'an, Shaanxi, China. As a member of Double First Class University Plan, C9 League, Project 985, and Project 211, it is a leading national university with special strengths in engineering, technology, applied economics, management, and life sciences. It is designated a Class A Double First Class University by the Ministry of Education. XJTU's twenty schools comprise a highly comprehensive university offering programs that cover all academic disciplines.

XJTU houses five state key laboratories, four state special laboratories, and two state engineering research centers.  Two of its eight affiliated teaching hospitals are ranked among China's top 100 hospitals. It is the hub of the University Alliance of the Silk Road, an international academic alliance under the umbrella of the China's Belt and Road Initiative that aims to build educational collaboration and fuel economic growth in countries along the Silk Road Economic Belt and key partners worldwide.

Xi'an Jiaotong University consistently features in the top 300th global universities as ranked by the QS World University Rankings, and the U.S. News & World Report, and the Academic Ranking of World Universities.

History

In 1896, the Nanyang Public School was founded in Shanghai based on an imperial edict issued by the Guangxu Emperor, under the Business and Telegraphs Office of the imperial government. Four schools were established: a normal school, a school of foreign studies, a middle school, and a high school. Sheng Xuanhuai, the mandarin who proposed the idea to the Guangxu Emperor, became the first president and is regarded as the founder of the university, along with John Calvin Ferguson, a missionary educator.

The university underwent a series of transitions. In 1904, the Ministry of Commerce took over the school, and in 1905 changed its name to Imperial Polytechnic College of the Commerce Ministry.  In 1906, the college was placed under the Ministry of Posts and Telegraphs, and its name was changed to Shanghai Industrial College of the Ministry of Posts and Telegraphs. When the Republic of China was founded, the college was placed under the Ministry of Communications and its name was once again changed, this time to Government Institute of Technology of the Communications Ministry.

The Republic of China founded the School of Management in 1918. In 1920, the Government Institute of Technology of the Communications Ministry merged with two other colleges and changed its name to Nan Yang College of Chiao Tung.  In 1938, the Ministry of Education took over the university and renamed it, National Chiao Tung University. During the anti-Japanese War, the university moved to the French Concession, and in 1940 the state-run branch of Jiaotong University was set up in Chongqing. In 1941, to prevent the Wang puppet government from taking over the university, it continued operations under the name of Private Nanyang University. In 1942, the Wang government took over Shanghai School. So the Education Department of Guomin Government chose Chongqing Branch as the headquarters of Jiaotong University. In 1943, the graduate school was founded. After the anti-Japanese War was won, Chongqing headquarter went back to Shanghai and merged with Shanghai School. In 1946, the name of state-run Jiaotong University was recovered.

After the Kuomintang were defeated in 1949, a part of the faculty retreated to Taiwan with Chiang Kai-shek and, in 1958, formed the eponymous National Chiao Tung University in Taiwan.  The institution that remained in Shanghai was renamed Chiao Tung University to reflect the fact that all universities under the new socialist state would be public.  In the 1950s, the pinyin romanization system was developed in Mainland China and Chiao Tung University changed its English name to Jiao Tong University.

The national strategy adopted in 1956 dictated that the majority of Jiao Tong University would be moved to Xi'an, Shaanxi(). During the movement, the national strategy was changed and there were questions on necessity of the move. Since the majority of the facilities, staffs, faculties and students had already arrived in Xi'an and the campus had started operated, the university decided to operate two campuses, one in Xi'an and another in Shanghai. However, the operation with two campuses were difficult and moving the Xi'an campus back to Shanghai was impossible. Thus, from July 31, 1959, with the approval from State Council of the People's Republic of China, two campuses became independent. The Xi'an campus changed its name to Xi'an Jiaotong University and the Shanghai campus changed its name to Shanghai Jiao Tong University. Xi'an Jiaotong University was immediately listed as a National Key University. Later, it became one of a handful of universities built according to the "Seventh Five-Year Plan" and "Eighth Five-Year Plan." In 2000, the State Council approved a merger of Xi'an Medical University and the Shaanxi Institute of Finance and Economics into Xi'an Jiaotong University.

Xi'an Jiaotong University University has been part of all major government efforts to establish world-class universities in China, including Project 211, Project 985, the C9 League, and the Double First Class University Plan (Class A).

Faculty and staff
XJTU's faculty and staff of more than 5500 includes twelve members of the Chinese National Academy of Engineering, nine of whom are also members of the Chinese National Academy of Sciences; 38 Changjiang (Yangtze River) Scholars; and 25 National Science Fund for Distinguished Young Scholars award winners. From the perspective of teaching, XJTU's faculty and staff include five recipients of national teaching awards, 142 participants in the  Ministry of Education's "New Century Program for Promising Young Talent", and 547 recipients of government stipends for outstanding contributions to China. Notable faculty include Yu Mao-Hong, originator of unified strength theory.

Students and Academics

XJTU's 30,000 strong student body, including 15,000 graduate students, can pursue 84 undergraduate majors, 200 master's degree disciplines, and 115 doctoral disciplines. Among these, eight are designated as first-order key disciplines by the Chinese government.

International Students: At present there are more than 400 Foreign students from all over the world predominantly from Pakistan, Malaysia, Russia, Bangladesh, Nepal, ASEAN countries, Gulf countries, Central Asian countries, Australia, New Zealand and European countries.

Campus and student life

XJTU's three campuses (Xingqing, Yanta, and Qujiang) cover over 250 hectares. The Qian Xuesen Library (Xingqing campus) houses 5 million books, 4,100 current periodicals, 30,000 electronic periodicals, and more than 1 million electronic books. The library's computer system is fully integrated with the campus network, CERNET, and the Internet.

Students living on campus have modern dormitory, dining, and athletic facilities, including the Siyuan Student Activities Center.  Students are supported by scholarships and stipends, with scholarships for undergraduates totaling 12 million yuan per year, and additional annual support in the form of loans totaling 14.4 million yuan. XJTU's “innovation fund” distributes 50 million yuan per year to graduate students. The university has a psychological health education and counseling center for university students.

High school programs
The Honors Youth Program of Xi'an Jiaotong University (Chinese: 西安交大少年班), established in 1985, admits 140 high school freshmen annually to coursework at High School Affiliated to Xi'an Jiaotong University, Suzhou High School-SIP, or Tianjin Nankai High School. Students who pass can matriculate to XJTU without taking the Gaokao. Students who subsequently pass their undergraduate courses can begin master's programs at XJTU without taking the Postgraduate Admission Test.

Internet education
XJTU's Internet Education School. founded in 2001 as one of 15 experimental universities approved by the Chinese Ministry of Education to establish distance education. The university partners with a number of leading universities in China for this project. XJTU was involved in a number of nationwide experiments and pilot projects including the Ministry of Education "Demonstration Project of Internet Education Based on Satellite and Terrestrial Networks"; "Tenth Five-Year Plan" key project "real-time teaching system"; and the National Science Fund projects "Study of Individual and Interactive Virtual Collaborative Learning Environment" and "Study and Application of Personality Mining in E-Learning".

Notable alumni
Among XJTU's alumni are many renowned scholars, including Huajian Gao, Tsien Hsue-shen, Zhigang Suo, Tony Jun Huang, Changqing Chen, Xi Chen, Xi Yao, Yilu Liu, Shouren Ge (Ernest S. Kuh) Wu Wenjun, Xu Guangxian, Zhang Guangdou and An Wang.

Among XJTU's alumni are numerous famous entrepreneurs in both China and abroad, including the following:

Shane Zhang, Co-Head of Asia Pacific Investment Banking at Morgan Stanley

Zhou Hongyi, Founder and Chairman of the internet anti-virus and security company Qihoo, and an alumnus of the Special Class for Gifted Youth

Haitao Zheng, listed in MIT Technology Review's TR35 in 2005, and an alumnus of the Special Class for Gifted Youth

Cui Dianguo, Chairman, Executive Director of the CRRC Corporation

Zhao Huan, President of the Agricultural Bank of China

Wang Xingshan, Chairman and CEO of Inspur International Ltd

Liang Haishan, General Manager of Haier Corporation

Ge Honglin, CEO of the Aluminum Corporation of China Limited

Dong Wenbiao, the former chairman of the Board of Directors of China Minsheng Banking Corporation (CMBC)

Kate Wang, Chinese billionaire businesswoman

Rankings and reputation 
XJTU is one of the elite universities in China with its status as a Double First Class University, C9 League University, and a member of the University Alliance of the Silk Road. Xi'an Jiaotong University is ranked among China's top-10 research comprehensive universities and ranked first in West China region, with a combined population of almost 300 million. Xi'an Jiaotong graduates are highly desired in China and worldwide. In 2017, its Graduate Employability rankings placed at #101 in the world in the QS Graduate Employability Rankings.

For 2022, XJTU was ranked #219 by U.S. News & World Report Best Global University Ranking and 290 by QS World University Rankings and 101-150 band by Academic Ranking of World Universities.

Internationally, XJTU is regarded as one of the most reputable Chinese universities by the Times Higher Education World Reputation Rankings where it ranked 176-200th globally.

Medical School

The School of Medicine of Xi'an Jiaotong University, was founded in 1937 as the School of Medicine of National Peking University. It was renamed Xi'an Medical University in 1985, then to its current name after becoming affiliated with XJTU in April 2000. It is the only top medical science school directly attached to the Ministry of Health in the Northwest region, as well as a branch of Academy of Medical Science in China. About 40,000 advanced medical experts have been trained at the School of Medicine of XJTU since its founding.

The >4500 current students on campus include 400 doctoral students, 900 postgraduates and 3500 undergraduates. The school has excellent and experienced faculty as well as working staff, and the number has been over 4000 (staff in the affiliated hospitals also included). It has more than 620 professors and associate professors, 81 doctoral mentors, 13 experts who have made outstanding contributions on the state and provincial level and besides, 35 domestic and overseas visiting professors (3 are members of Chinese Academy of Science). There are 28 departments (18 clinical departments included); 3 Clinical Teaching Hospitals: The First Affiliated Hospital, The Second Affiliated Hospital and The Affiliated Dental Hospital; 6 centers (Biological Medicine R&E Center, Long-Distance Medicine Center, All-Division Medicine Center, Medical Information Center, Animal Experimentation Center and Medical Testing and Training Center); 27 Graduate Schools; 1 keystone lab belonging to Ministry of Education, 2 keystone labs belonging to Ministry of Health and 3 keystone labs at Provincial level; 2 keystone subjects as Physiology and Medical Jurisprudence at State level and another 7 keystone subjects at Provincial level. Meanwhile, the School of Medicine has 2 first-level research stations for the Post doctorates, Fundamental Medicine and Clinical Medicine.

It has gradually established a complete administrative system for educating and training both undergraduate and graduate students. For undergraduates, at present, there are subjects as Clinical Medicine (5-year duration and 7-year duration), Dental Medicine, Nursing, Medical Jurisprudence, Preventive Medicine, Pharmacology, Medical Engineering and so on. There are 10 authorized places for awarding doctorates and 29 places for master's degrees. The authorized places for awarding these degrees cover all medical specialities and most of the related medical specialities. For undergraduate student education the emphasis is on practice with basic knowledge and extensive education. The school has built up a training mode of  "Broad Entrance, Strong Foundation and Emphasis on Practice", and under this training mode, the graduates have got high praises from their employers. For postgraduate student education, the emphasis is on training on innovative thoughts and abilities. Besides, the school has actively developed recruitment and training for the students with bachelor's degree of Clinical Medicine and MPH.

International program: University Alliance of the Silk Road

As the major trading site of the silk road, Xi'an has emerged as the site of a major international university alliance associated with the One Belt, One Road initiative. The program was initiated by the principal Shuguo Wang, and it has held forums for it since 2015. The university is home to a vigorous international program of research and exchange, centered around the University Alliance of the Silk Road that was formed in 2015.

The university has partnerships with several other universities that have not been incorporated into the University Alliance of the Silk Road, including Universiti Tunku Abdul Rahman and Washington University in St. Louis through the McDonnell International Scholars Academy.

See also
 Xi'an Jiaotong-Liverpool University
 Shanghai Jiao Tong University
 Southwest Jiaotong University
 Beijing Jiaotong University
 Hingchu Chiao Tung University
 BlueSky Open Platform
 The High School Affiliated to Xi'an Jiaotong University

References

External links

 
1896 establishments in China
Educational institutions established in 1896
C9 League
Jiaotong University
Project 211
Project 985
Plan 111
Universities and colleges in Xi'an
Universities in China with English-medium medical schools
Vice-ministerial universities in China